Operation Granby, commonly abbreviated Op Granby, was the code name given to the British military operations during the 1991 Gulf War.  53,462 members of the British Armed Forces were deployed during the conflict.  The total cost of operations was £2.434 billion (1992), of which at least £2.049 billion was paid for by other nations such as Kuwait and Saudi Arabia; £200 million of equipment was lost or written off.

The Joint Commander Gulf Forces, based in the United Kingdom at RAF High Wycombe, was Air Chief Marshal (ACM) Sir Patrick Hine 1 October 1990 – 31 March 1991, and Air Chief Marshal Sir Michael Graydon from 31 March 1991.  His political adviser was Andrew Palmer.  The Commander British Forces Middle East, the in-theatre commander, based in Riyadh, was initially Air Marshal (AM) Andrew Wilson (September–October 1990), then Lieutenant-General Sir Peter de la Billière 6 October 1990 – March 1991, and Air Vice-Marshal Ian Macfadyen from March 1991.

The Air Commander British Forces Middle East, initially Arabian Peninsula, was Air Vice Marshal Andrew Wilson from August to 17 November 1990, then Air Vice Marshal William (Bill) Wratten from 17 November 1990.

Royal Air Force

Within nine days of the invasion of Kuwait on 2 August 1990, 12 Panavia Tornado F3 interceptors from 5 (AC) Squadron and 29 (F) Squadron from RAF Coningsby had arrived in Saudi Arabia, alongside aircraft of the United States Air Force (USAF).  Later, Jaguar GR1 aircraft from RAF Coltishall, and Tornado GR1s, redeployed from service in RAF Germany deployed to the theatre. Buccaneer aircraft from RAF Lossiemouth were also deployed in order to laser designate ground targets for the Tornado and Jaguar.  This action had the effect of maintaining the confidence of friendly nations, and limiting the potential for further Iraqi expansion.  When an economic embargo was placed on Iraq, these aircraft also helped maintain it.  The force of Tornado F3s was expanded to 18, drawn from the three British bases then housing F3s (RAF Leuchars, RAF Leeming, and RAF Coningsby), with 27 air crew and 350 ground personnel.  They were based at the Royal Saudi Air Force airbase at Dhahran, from where they flew patrols inside the range of Iraqi ground radar systems.  Before the launch of the operation to liberate Kuwait, they flew over 2000 sorties. Victor tankers based at Jubail Naval Base provided AAR support to all the coalition aircraft. Hercules, VC10, and TriStar aircraft supplied both the Royal Air Force and other military endeavours; Nimrod MR.2P aircraft assisted naval operations.  At bases in Tabuk, Dhahran, and Muharraq, the RAF deployed Rapier missiles as part of surface-to-air defences.  In total, around 6,000 RAF personnel were deployed to the Gulf.

RAF commanders, along with the other partners in the coalition, deemed it necessary to prevent the Iraqi Air Force (IrAF) operating to any significant degree.  Believed to have around 700 combat aircraft, as well as Scud ballistic missiles and chemical weapons, they could not be left to help support Iraqi ground forces, now entrenched in positions on the border.  Because of the level of supplies coming from Iraq to forces in Kuwait, it would have been impossible to separate targets merely in Kuwait from an offensive into Iraq.  Coalition forces outnumbered the IrAF 3-to-1.

The first part of the Gulf War air campaign was directed against the IrAF.  Early on 17 January, RAF Tornado GR1s flew into Iraq, with air-to-air refuelling tanker support.  The first targets were Iraqi airbases, which housed a variety of defence systems and aircraft.  These attacks were co-ordinated in Riyadh by the Joint Allied Headquarters, with Wratten now leading the British command; aircraft were almost totally integrated into a single coalition force.  Support aircraft in raids, therefore, could be from any coalition power.  Within 24 hours, a hundred sorties had been completed.  After seven days, the RAF's focus, like the rest of coalition air forces, was moved to targets related to the support of Iraqi forces in Kuwait.  These included oil refinery, and strategic bridges over the River Euphrates.  During operations, civilians were killed when the sophisticated guidance systems on the weaponry used failed, and buildings close to these bridges (many in populated areas) were hit instead.  On the whole, many pilots were frustrated by the lack of combat.

In every combat role, the RAF was second to USAF involvement, but ahead of other members of the coalition.  Of the around 55 Allied aircraft lost, eight were RAF Tornados; these aircraft types flew a total of 2,500 sorties.  Five air crew were lost in operations, and three in preparations.

British Army

A single British Army armoured brigade was initially dispatched to the Gulf, later augmented to a two-brigade division, which became the British 1st Armoured Division. The decision was made that the relatively new Challenger tank be sent, rather than the older and more reliable Chieftain tanks, which were being superseded. The Prime Minister, Margaret Thatcher, "insisted on Challenger's reliability in the Gulf. In consequence to this demand BAOR regiments became 'a scrap yard' of [tank hulls] without spares, sitting on wooden blocks. Everything else was being sent to the Gulf as spares in support of 7th Armoured Brigade." The entire British Army's power pack repair facility was deployed to the Gulf with the division.

During the ground phase, the 1st Armoured Division took part in the "left-hook" which outflanked Iraqi forces. It participated in the Battle of Norfolk. British Challenger 1 tanks destroyed approximately 300 Iraqi tanks, including achieving the longest-range tank-kill in the war from three miles away. The British Army also inflicted heavy artillery and various other combat vehicle losses on the Iraqi Army. The British Army destroyed approximately five Iraqi divisions in 48 hours of combat.  A friendly fire incident, when an American Fairchild Republic A-10A Thunderbolt aircraft attacked two British Warrior vehicles, resulted in the deaths of nine British service personnel.

Royal Navy
The Royal Navy made a significant contribution to Allied efforts in the early stages of the war.  In particular, Royal Navy Westland Lynx helicopters were responsible for the destruction of almost the entire Iraqi Navy in the Battle of Bubiyan (also known as the Battle of the Bubiyan Channel).  Additionally, Royal Navy minehunters cleared Iraqi mines near the Kuwaiti coast, allowing the US battleships Wisconsin and Missouri to move in close enough to launch devastating bombardments against Iraqi ground forces. HMS Gloucester intercepted an Iraqi Silkworm missile heading towards HMS London, mine countermeasures vessels, and the US battleships.

See also
 Operation Granby order of battle
 List of Gulf War military equipment#United Kingdom
 List of British gallantry awards for Operation Granby

References

Further reading
 Allen, Charles. Thunder & lightning: the RAF in the Gulf: personal experiences of war (HM Stationery Office/Tso, 1991).
 de la Billiere, Peter. "The Gulf Conflict: Planning and Execution." The RUSI Journal 136#4 (1991): 7–12.
 Hayr, Kenneth. "Logistics in the Gulf War." The RUSI Journal 136#3 (1991): 14–19.
 Newell, Clayton R.  The A to Z of the Persian Gulf War 1990 – 1991 (2007).
 Smith, Rupert. "The Gulf War: The land battle." The RUSI Journal 137#1 (1992): 1–5.

External links

 Operation Granby — Royal Air Force index at RAF.mod.uk
  – Despatch by Air Chief Marshal Sir Patrick Hine GCB ADC FRAES CBIM RAF Joint Commander of Operation Granby
 British Forces involved in Op Granby — at RAF.mod.uk
 ORBAT listing 1st Armoured Division Troops

20th-century military history of the United Kingdom
Wars involving the United Kingdom
Granby
Iraq–United Kingdom military relations
Kuwait–United Kingdom military relations
Saudi Arabia–United Kingdom military relations